Jonction Basket is a professional basketball club based in Geneva, Switzerland.

History
The club became one of the major powers in the 50s Swiss Basketball League (so called Championnat LNA)when it won six champion titles in a row from 1953 to 1958.

Honours

Domestic competitions
 Swiss League
 Winners (6): 1952–53, 1953–54, 1954–55, 1955–56, 1956–57, 1957–58

European competitions
 Latin Cup
 4th place (1): 1953

References

Basketball teams in Switzerland
Sport in Geneva